Tatsiana Stukalava (born October 3, 1975 in Vitebsk) is a Belarusian weightlifter who competed in the Women's 63 kg weight class at the 2004 Summer Olympics and won the bronze medal, lifting 222.5 kg in total.

References

1975 births
Sportspeople from Vitebsk
Living people
Belarusian female weightlifters
Weightlifters at the 2004 Summer Olympics
Olympic weightlifters of Belarus
Olympic bronze medalists for Belarus
Olympic medalists in weightlifting
Medalists at the 2004 Summer Olympics